KFUM is the Scandinavian translation of YMCA. It may also refer to:

Sports
Fuglebakken KFUM Århus, football club from Aarhus, Denmark
KFUM Borås, multi-sport club from Borås, Sweden
KFUM Jönköping, sports club from Jönköping, Sweden
KFUM Nässjö, basketball club from Nässjö, Sweden
KFUM Örebro, sports club from Örebro, Sweden
KFUM Roskilde, football club from Roskilde, Denmark
KFUMs Boldklub København, sports club from Copenhagen, Denmark
KFUM-Kameratene Oslo, sports club from Oslo, Norway
Silkeborg KFUM, football club from Silkeborg, Denmark
Silkeborg-Voel KFUM, handball club from Silkeborg, Denmark

Stadiums
KFUM Arena, football stadium in Oslo, Norway